Eugene Rosenberg  (October 16, 1935) is a microbiologist at the Faculty of Life Sciences at Tel Aviv University, an expert in the field of applied environmental microbiology, in particular his work on Myxobacteria, microorganisms to combat pollution (bioremediation), and the Hologenome theory of evolution.

Early life and education
Rosenberg was born in New York City in 1935, grew up in Los Angeles, and immigrated to Israel in 1970. He received his Bachelor of Science from the University of California Los Angeles (UCLA) and his  Ph.D. from the Department of Biochemistry at Columbia University, New York (1961). His doctoral thesis, under the supervision of Steven Zamenhof, describes the chemical structures of the capsules of Hemophilus influenzae, types B, E, and F. Rosenberg went on to postdoctoral research in organic chemistry under the guidance of Lord Todd in Cambridge University (1962). Between 1962 and 1970 he was first Assistant and then Associate Professor of microbiology at UCLA,  concentrating on the biochemistry of Myxococcus xanthus.
In 1970 he has been a member of the academic staff in the Department of Molecular Microbiology and Biotechnology at Tel Aviv University, where he was appointed Full Professor in 1975 and Professor Emeritus in 2006. He has held the Gol Chair in Applied and Environmental Microbiology since 1989. 
Recently, he  served as the editor-in-chief for The Prokaryotes, a comprehensive reference encyclopedia on Bacteria and Archea.

Academic

Rosenberg’s early work in Israel focused on myxobacteriology, hydrocarbon microbiology, surface-active polymers from Acinetobacter, and bioremediation. In collaboration with his department colleagues Eliora Z. Ron and David Gutnik, he introduced the pioneering use of microorganisms and bioemulsifiers to treat oil pollution in oil tankers, pipelines and on beaches
In later years he collaborated with Yossi Loya (Zoology Dept., Tel Aviv University) to research coral disease. They demonstrated for the first time that coral bleaching is the result of an infectious disease and that a rise in temperature due to global warming causes pathogenic micro organisms to be more active and cause infectious epidemic diseases.
His most recent work has developed the "hologenome concept of evolution" (together with Ilana Zilber-Rosenberg). This groundbreaking concept posits that the holobiont (host plus all of its associated microorganisms) and its hologenome (sum of the genetic information of the host and its symbiotic microorganisms), function as a unique biological entity and therefore as a level of selection in evolution. According to the hologenome concept microbial symbionts and the host interact in a cooperative way that affects the health of the holobiont within its environment, and the sum of these cooperative interactions characterizes the holobiont as a unique biological entity. He contends that under environmental stress, the microbiome can change more rapidly and in response to more processes than the host organism alone and thus influences the evolution of the holobiont. Prebiotics, probiotics, synbiotics and phage therapy are conceived as applied aspects of the hologenome concept.

Awards

In 1983-1984 Rosenberg was appointed as a Fellow of the Guggenheim Foundation. In 1992 he was awarded with the Pan Lab Prize of the Society of Industrial Microbiology and in 1993 he was awarded as a Fogarty International scholar at the National Institute Of Health (NIH). Jointly with Prof.Eliora Ron he received the Israel Prize for a Beautiful Israel in 1995. In 2002 he was awarded the Sakov Prize for ecological research and in 2003, the Procter & Gamble Prize of the American Society for Microbiology (ASM) and together with Yossi Loya, the Landau Prize by Mifaal Hapais in Life Sciences.

Rosenberg has supervised numerous graduate students and postdocs. He is a Fellow of the American Academy of Microbiology. He is the author of approximately 270 research papers and reviews, 10 books, and 16 patents.

Selected publications
Books
 Rosenberg, E, Zilber-Rosenberg, I. (2014). The Hologenome Concept: Human, Animal and Plant Microbiota.  Springer. 
 Rosenberg, E., E, F, DeLong, S. Lory, E. Stackebrandt, F. Thompson, Eds. (2013). The Prokaryotes. 
 Rosenberg, E. and U. Gophna, eds. (2011). Beneficial Microorganisms in Multicellular Life Forms Springer, Heidelberg. 
 Rosenberg, E. and Y. Loya, eds. (2004). Coral Health and Disease Berlin Springer. 
 Rosenberg, E., ed. (1998). Microbial Ecology and Infectious Disease Washington, DC: ASM Press American Society for Microbiology. 
 Rosenberg, E., ed. (1993). Microorganisms to Combat Pollution  Springer. 
 Rosenberg, E., ed. (1984).Myxobacteria:Development and cell interactions Springer. . 
 Rosenberg, E. and I. R. Cohen, eds. (1983). Microbial Biology Philadelphia: Saunders College. 
 Rosenberg, E. (1971). Cell and Molecular Biology: An Appreciation  Holt, Rinehart and Winston, Inc., New York. 

Articles and Reviews
 Rosenberg, E. and Ron. E (2014). Enhanced bioremediation of oil spills in the sea. Current Opinions in Biotechnology, 27-191-194.
 
 
 
 
 
 
 
 
 
 
 
 Rosenberg, E. (1993). Microbial diversity as a source of useful biopolymers. (Pan Award) J. Ind. Microbiol. 11: 131-137.
 Rosenberg, E., J.M. Porter, P.D. Nathan, A. Major and M. Varon (1984). Antibiotic TA: An adherent antibiotic. Bio/Technology 2:796-799.
 Rosenberg, M., D.L. Gutnick and E. Rosenberg (1980). Adherence to hydrocarbons: A simple method for measuring cell-surface hydrophobicity. FEMS  Microbiol. Lett. 9:29-33 Citation Classic. April 22, 1992.

References 

1935 births
Israeli microbiologists
Israeli Jews
Living people